King Saud bin Abdulaziz University for Health Sciences (KSAU-HS) (Arabic: جامعة الملك سعود بن عبد العزيز للعلوم الصحية) is a public university in the Kingdom of Saudi Arabia and the Middle East region specializing in health sciences. Its headquarters is in the main campus in Riyadh, the capital of Saudi Arabia. It has two other campuses in Jeddah and Al-Ahsa.

History
The university was formally established in 2005. The advanced medical facilities at the King Abdulaziz Medical Cities in Riyadh, Jeddah and Al-Ahsa proved to be critical foundations for the successful inception of the university.

KSAU-HS's main campus is in Riyadh with two additional campuses in Jeddah and Al-Ahsa. The main campus in Riyadh hosts seven colleges: College of Medicine, College of Dentistry, College of Pharmacy, College of Public Health and Health Informatics, College of Applied Medial Sciences, College of Nursing and the College of Science & Health Professions. Jeddah Campus hosts College of Medicine, College of Nursing, College of Applied Medical Sciences and College of Sciences and Health Professions. Finally, Al-Ahsa Campus hosts College of Applied Medical Sciences, College of Nursing, and College of Sciences and Health Professions.

The umbrella of NGHA has given the KSAU-HS students access to King Abdulaziz Medical Cities in Riyadh, Jeddah and Al-Ahsa, which are considered to be the most advanced medical complexes in the region. Furthermore, it has enabled KSAU-HS to enhance its curricula and academic programs with clinical applications and training under health professionals.

Campuses

Riyadh
The campus is in the east of Riyadh and officially opened in April 2013. Its design is a mix of contemporary and Islamic architecture. The campus has a capacity of ten thousand students, but it can accommodate future increase in student enrolment.

There is a large landscaping area connecting the buildings with footpaths.  In addition, there is a trolleybus line that connects the main areas of the campus with the housing compound.

Main units on campus

International collaboration

KSAU-HS has a number of agreements and memoranda for academic collaboration with reputable North American, European, and Australian universities and institutions.

Memorandum of understanding with Royal College of Physicians and Surgeons of Canada, for the establishment of a Collaborating Center for CanMEDS competencies in Saudi Arabia. It will serve as the hub of a network of medical educators, trainers, and faculty committed to support, develop, and facilitate CanMEDS in all domain of medical education at both undergraduate, and postgraduate levels, as well as in the professional practice.	 	

The center will host and present a series of conferences & workshops on residency training, and develop network of medical educators, and deliver education and training to the trainees in postgraduate medical education programs in Saudi Arabia. In Nov 2010, KSAU-HS hosted The Saudi Arabian Conference on Residency Education (SACRE). This conference was a landmark event that highlighted the collaboration KSAU-HS has with the Royal College of Physicians and Surgeons of Canada. Topic discussed in the conference program included key trends in development of residency education, quality in residency program, contemporary and emerging tools for assessment of resident competence, simulation technology to teaching & learning in postgraduate medical education, teaching the domains of physician competence using the CanMEDS framework, best research in residency education, new approaches for enhancing excellence in teaching and assessment in residency, current controversies in residency education and the implications for their own program.

The Association for Medical Education in the Eastern Mediterranean Region (AMEEMR) selected King Saud bin Abdulaziz University to be its headquarters. This decision came at the Association's 2010 General Assembly, which College of Medicine at KSAU-HS hosted. Twenty-three representatives from fifteen countries and a representative for President of World Federation for Medical Education (WFME) attended the meeting.

KSAU-HS has a number of licensing agreements to develop its academic programs with prestigious universities worldwide: University of Sydney (Australia); University of Liverpool (UK); South Alabama University (USA); Flinders University (Australia); University of Arkansas (USA), Thomas Jefferson University (USA) University of Maryland (USA), Maastricht University (Netherlands), The University of Oklahoma (USA) and the University of Tennessee Health Science Center (USA).

See also

 King Abdulllah Abdul Aziz Health Encyclopedia

References

 https://web.archive.org/web/20080627151441/http://www.emro.who.int/hped/Countries.asp

External links
 
  (English)

2005 establishments in Saudi Arabia
Educational institutions established in 2005
Universities and colleges in Saudi Arabia
Education in Riyadh